TPCIT (Tashkent Professional College of Information Technologies) is one of the oldest educational institutions in Uzbekistan.

Directions of education
The college conducts the training of specialist in 3 directions:
 Informatics and Information Technologies
 Telecommunications
 Accounting

Chairs
 Department of Humanities
 Department of Foreign Languages
 Department of Social Sciences
 Department of Natural Mathematical Sciences
 Department of Information Technologies
 Department of Programming
 Department of Telecommunications
 Department of Economic Subjects
 Department of Initial Pre-Conscription Training for Youth
 Department of Physical Education

References

External links

 Tashkent Professional College of Information Technologies
 The Center for Secondary Specialized, Vocational Education

Education in Tashkent